Brandenburg-Southwest is a NUTS-2 Region of Germany, encompassing the southwestern portion of the state of Brandenburg.

References

Brandenburg
NUTS 2 statistical regions of Germany